"Four Little Diamonds" is a song by the British rock music group Electric Light Orchestra (ELO) from their 1983 album Secret Messages. It was also featured on their compilation albums Afterglow (with a slightly longer intro) and Flashback. The single did not do very well in the US, spending only 2 weeks on the Billboard Hot 100 chart and peaking at number 86. It also charted low in the UK, peaking at number 84.

The song refers to the search made by the singer for his cheating lover who also emotionally conned him because of a ring which had 'four little diamonds' set into it.

There was also a UK 12-inch JET 3 Track version with "The Bouncer" on the B-side.
A UK 7-inch picture disc was also released featuring a competition to win 1 of 25 copies of the album re-cut from the master.

Track listing
All songs written by Jeff Lynne.
7"
"Four Little Diamonds" – 3:57
"Letter from Spain" – 2:51

UK 12"

"Four Little Diamonds" – 3:57
"Letter from Spain" – 2:51
"The Bouncer" – 3:13

Chart positions

In the media
The song is featured in video game Grand Theft Auto: Vice City on the in-game radio station "Flash FM".

References

1983 songs
1983 singles
Electric Light Orchestra songs
Song recordings produced by Jeff Lynne
Songs written by Jeff Lynne
Jet Records singles